Tachydromiinae is a subfamily of hybotid flies widespread in the world.

Tribes and Genera 
 Tribe Symballophthalmini Bradley, Sinclair & Cumming, 2006
 Symballophthalmus Becker, 1889
 Tribe Drapetini Collin, 1961
 Allodromia Smith, 1962
 Atodrapetis Plant, 1997
 Austrodrapetis Smith, 1964
 Austrodromia Collin, 1961
 Chaetodromia Chillcott & Teskey, 1983
 Chersodromia Haliday in Walker, 1851
 Crossopalpus Bigot, 1857
 Drapetis Meigen, 1822
 Dusmetina Gil Collado, 1930
 Elaphropeza Macquart, 1827
 Isodrapetis Collin, 1961
 Megagrapha Melander, 1928
 Micrempis Melander, 1928
 Nanodromia Grootaert, 1994
 Ngaheremyia Plant & Didham, 2006
 Pontodromia Grootaert, 1994
 Sinodrapetis Yang, Gaimari & Grootaert, 2004
 Stilpon Loew, 1859
Tribe Tachydromiini
 Charadrodromia Melander, 1928
 Dysaletria Loew, 1864
 Pieltainia Arias, 1919
 Platypalpus Macquart, 1827
 Tachydromia Meigen, 1803
 Tachyempis Melander, 1928
 Tachypeza Meigen, 1830

Extinct genera 

†Archaeodrapetiops Martins-Neto et al. 1992 Tremembé Formation, Brazil, Chattian
†Archiplatypalpus Kovalev 1974 Taimyr Amber, Santonian
†Cretoplatypalpus Kovalev 1978 Taimyr Amber, Cenomanian Canadian amber, Campanian
†Eodromyia Myskowiak et al. 2018 Oise amber, France, Ypresian
†Drapetiella Meunier 1908 Baltic amber, Eocene
†Electrocyrtoma Cockerell 1917 Burmese amber, Myanmar, Cenomanian
†Lochmocola Hong 1981 Fushun amber, China, Ypresian
†Mesoplatypalpus Grimaldi and Cumming 1999 Canadian amber, Campanian

References

Hybotidae
Brachycera subfamilies